The 1977 Daytona 500, the 19th running of the event, was held on February 20, 1977, as the second race of the 1977 NASCAR Winston Cup Series Season.

First Daytona 500 starts for Janet Guthrie, Ricky Rudd, Ron Hutcherson, Elliott Forbes-Robinson and Bobby Wawak. Only Daytona 500 start for Sam Sommers. Last Daytona 500 starts for Bob Burcham, Terry Ryan, Walter Ballard, Salt Walther, Ramo Stott, Ed Negre, and Jim Hurtubise.

Summary
Cale Yarborough won his second Daytona 500 and it would lead to his second straight Winston Cup title, and Donnie Allison won his second pole position for this event. Janet Guthrie made history at this race as the first female NASCAR Cup Series driver; getting a 12th place finish in the process.

Bobby Wawak bailed out of his car while it was still moving and on fire on lap 3. Seconds later the car slammed the inside wall by the entrance to pit road. This resulted in the first Top 10 finish for Jimmy Means, the final Top 10 finish for Bob Burcham, and the last Top 5 finish for the late Coo Coo Marlin.

Jim Vandiver retired from the NASCAR Winston Cup Series after this race. Richard Petty started the race 7/8 from pit lane in last place. He caught a break with the caution for Wawak's fire then worked his way through the field back into contention only to later blow the engine and drop out. Donnie Allison blew a tire at the start/finish line on lap 88, and was forced to limp into the pits, where his team discovered too much damage had been done, so they pulled the car out of the race.

Defending Daytona 500 David Pearson also had mechanical issues. The Silver Fox led two laps but like Petty, his #21 Purolator Mercury was sidelined with a blown engine before the 3/4 mark. USAC Champ Car racer Salt Walther's last NASCAR Cup start ended in a backstretch crash. A gust of wind caught Walther's self-owned #4 Chevrolet and caused him to lose it triggering a three-car incident that also included Buddy Baker and Dave Marcis. Baker recovered to finish third but Salt was done for the day.

Once Petty and Pearson were gone the race came down to a battle between Cale Yarborough and Benny Parsons that saw Yarborough eventually prevail.

References

NASCAR races at Daytona International Speedway
Daytona 500
Dayton
Daytona 500